is a Japanese film from 2005. A surreal, experimental film, it was one of the early works of Osaka-based filmmaker, Hiroshi Nishio. The film was featured both in the Raindance Film Festival Programme in 2005 in London, as well as the Osaka  festival.

Plotline 
Hana, traumatized by a sexual assault, seeks advice from her doctor, who advise her to write letters to her genitalia. He advises her to establish a connection between her heart and her loins.

Cast 
 Yoko Ueda
 Wataru Kawaguchi
 Chiemi Minamiyama.

References 

2005 films
2000s Japanese-language films
2000s Japanese films